Sekai (Japanese: 世界 "World") is a Japanese monthly political magazine published by Iwanami Shoten, which was founded in December 1945. The first issue was published in 1946. The magazine is published monthly. It has a left-wing or progressive political stance. The magazine's founding principles were "peace and social justice, freedom and equality, and harmony and solidarity with the peoples of East Asia." The headquarters is in Tokyo. Yamaguchi Akio served as an editor of the magazine for a long period.

References

External links
Official website

1945 establishments in Japan
Magazines established in 1945
Magazines published in Tokyo
Monthly magazines published in Japan
Political magazines published in Japan
Progressivism in Japan
Socialist magazines